
Gmina Żórawina is a rural gmina (administrative district) in Wrocław County, Lower Silesian Voivodeship, in south-western Poland.

It is part of the Wrocław metropolitan area.

Neighbouring gminas
Gmina Żórawina is bordered by the gminas of Borów, Domaniów, Kobierzyce and Siechnice.

Villages
The gmina contains the villages of Bogunów, Bratowice, Brzeście, Galowice, Jaksonów, Jarosławice, Karwiany, Komorowice, Krajków, Marcinkowice, Mędłów, Milejowice, Mnichowice, Nowojowice, Nowy Śleszów, Okrzeszyce, Pasterzyce, Polakowice, Przecławice, Racławice Małe, Rynakowice, Rzeplin, Stary Śleszów, Suchy Dwór, Szukalice, Turów, Węgry, Wilczków, Wilkowice, Wojkowice, Zagródki, Żerniki Wielkie and Żórawina.

References

Zorawina
Wrocław County